Presidential elections were held in El Salvador on 26 January 1850. Doroteo Vasconcelos ran unopposed and was elected by the legislature and the constitution was amended to allow his reelection.

Results

References

El Salvador
President
Election and referendum articles with incomplete results
Presidential elections in El Salvador
Single-candidate elections